Ranjith Kumar Jayaseelan is an Indian track and field athlete. He won the bronze medal in the Men's Seated Discus Throw EAD at the 2006 Commonwealth Games, with a throw of 29.88 meters.

References

Living people
Commonwealth Games bronze medallists for India
Year of birth missing (living people)
Indian male discus throwers
Commonwealth Games medallists in athletics
Athletes (track and field) at the 2006 Commonwealth Games
Medallists at the 2006 Commonwealth Games